Mundaun is a former municipality in the district of Surselva in the canton of Graubünden, Switzerland. It was formed on 1 January 2009 through the merger of Flond and Surcuolm.  On 1 January 2016 the former municipalities of Obersaxen and Mundaun merged to form the new municipality of Obersaxen Mundaun.

Geography
 
Of this area, 60.7% is used for agricultural purposes, while 29.0% is forested. Of the rest of the land, 4.7% is settled (buildings or roads) and the remainder (5.7%) is non-productive (rivers, glaciers or mountains).

The former municipality is located in the Lugnez sub-district of the Surselva district.  It is located on the Obersaxen high plateau south of the Vorderrhein river.

Demographics
Mundaun has a population (as of 2014) of 301, of which 6.2% of the population was made up of foreign nationals.

The age distribution, in Mundaun is; 43 children or 13.9% of the population are between 0 and 9 years old and 44 teenagers or 14.2% are between 10 and 19.  Of the adult population, 29 people or 9.4% of the population are between 20 and 29 years old.  49 people or 15.9% are between 30 and 39, 45 people or 14.6% are between 40 and 49, and 34 people or 11.0% are between 50 and 59.  The senior population distribution is 24 people or 7.8% of the population are between 60 and 69 years old, 28 people or 9.1% are between 70 and 79, there are 13 people or 4.2% who are between 80 and 89.

The historical population is given in the following table:

References

External links

 
 
 

Obersaxen Mundaun
Former municipalities of Graubünden